The Big Ram Site, designated Site 36.32 by the Maine Archeological Survey, is a prehistoric archaeological site on Ram Island, an island in the Androscoggin River in Turner, Maine.  The site, excavated in 1987, yielded ceramic and other artifacts dating to two periods of occupation,  CE, and  CE.  The site was listed on the National Register of Historic Places in 1992.

Description
The Big Ram Site is located on Ram Island, one of a small cluster of islands in the Androscoggin River roughly  downriver from Maine State Route 219.  The soil of the wooded island is sandy, and is subject to occasional flooding that leaves additional deposits.  The site on the island was identified by survey in 1987, at which time it was subjected to test excavations.  In addition to artifacts found at the site, there is evidence of at least one habitation layer from which charcoal and fire-cracked rocks were removed.  Stone artifacts recovered include flakes of quartz and rhyolite, while burnt seeds and ceramic pottery fragments were also found.  The ceramics, which were not datable in the present context, are consistent with finds from other, datable, sites representing two separate periods of occupation.  The first, a find with a smooth surface and dentate markings, is similar to finds dated elsewhere to the Middle Woodland Period ( CE), while another fragment, with an incised exterior, is similar to Late Woodland or early contact-period finds ( CE).

The site is significant as a well-preserved, well stratified site containing clear evidence of occupation during two periods.

See also
National Register of Historic Places listings in Androscoggin County, Maine

References

Archaeological sites on the National Register of Historic Places in Maine
Androscoggin County, Maine
National Register of Historic Places in Androscoggin County, Maine